Verona is a small town in rural Onslow County, on the outskirts of Jacksonville, North Carolina, United States. Verona is bordered by Highway 17 to the east, Verona Rd. to the north, and High Hill Rd. to the South. High Hill  and Verona Rds. intersect to form the western boundary. 
The population of Verona in the 2000 census was approximately 178 people. The demographic breakdown was: Caucasian: 86%, Hispanic: 9%, African-American:  < 5%, Other:  < 2%.

Industry 
Most of Verona's population consists of middle class workers in the cities of Jacksonville, or Holly Ridge. The largest business is the Verona Quik Mart, a convenience store and gas station. The second largest business in Verona is the Jones LP gas and equipment service. The oldest business still operating in Verona today is Louie Foy's Homemade Honey retail. Mr. Foy has his own hives and has been canning his own honey to sell for decades.

Historical Importance 
There have been settlers in the Verona area since the early 18th century.  
Founding families of Verona, many of which are still there today include the Foy, Padgett, Rochelle, Ottoway, Brown, Davis, Fisher, and Parker families.

The Railroad  
In 1897, The Wilmington, New Bern and Norfolk Railroad Company laid a railway from Jacksonville, to Wilmington, running through Verona. The Railway through Verona ran from 1897 to 1984, when the trains where shut down, and the tracks were torn up. Shortly after the tracks were laid, a large three story train station was built in Verona on the intersection of Loy Avenue and Verona Rd. Although the tracks operated until 1984, the Train Station shut down in the late 1940s. The Railway mostly carried lumber and industrial supplies from Jacksonville to Wilmington. During World War II, and the Korean War the railway played a vital role in the U.S. war effort as a troop train route. Marines were carried from the newly constructed Marine Corps Base Camp Lejeune to the port of Wilmington to be deployed.  
The train station was torn down and the warehouse was used as Verona's Fire Department in 1961. From around 1900 to the 1960s, there was a post office in Verona, and Verona was given its address: Verona, NC. In the 1960s the county townships were reorganized, and Verona became part of rural Jacksonville, causing the address of Verona's citizens to change to Jacksonville, NC. Verona lost its post office and was put on the city postal route.

United States Marine Corps Base Camp Lejeune  
In the year 1941, the United States Government began building Marine Corps Base Camp Lejeune, the largest amphibious base in the country. To gain the property for the base, Eminent Domain was enforced condemning the lands of many Verona residents, some of which lost land that had been in their families for over a century. 
In a personal account by Myrtle Margaret Fisher published in The Heritage of Onslow County, she said: 
They (her parents Joseph Cephus Fisher and Sarah Margaret Swinson Fisher) made their home at Maple Hill for several years and some of the children were born there but most of us were born at Verona on the "Old Fisher Place" which has long since grown up and abandoned. After their move to the Loop Road of Verona, which was across the tracks on property purchased from Mama’s brother Vannie, four more children were born making us a family of four children.
Eventually our farm became a self supporting one. Unknowingly, we would live on condemned property in the Stump Sound Township, where the U.S. Government had preconceived ideas of building a very large military complex on the coastal waters of our county for the training of soldiers. It would later become the largest amphibious base in the world. Time passed with many attempts to obtain a better price than my parents were offered for the farm and acreage, so Daddy was forced to sell to the government. The sale was finalized on October 30, 1941. It was disbursed as follows: for the 210 acres of land: $2505.00, dwelling: $800.00, barn: $200.00, smoke house: $35.00, poultry house: $5.00, two tobacco barns: $200.00, and for all the timber they were paid $600.00. This wasn’t nearly enough for the farm and timber but there was nothing else they felt could be done as they had several meetings with government officials with no let-up on price.

Following the building of Camp Lejeune many families were put in situations like Ms. Myrtle Fisher's family, with no house, and no land and very little compensation for the property they were forced to sell to the government. A major problem was that when the base came, it brought industry to Jacksonville, increasing the value of the land. So the displaced persons that had to sell to the government were now looking for new land with very little money, and property prices much, much higher. It took most individuals two to five years to resettle, and some had to leave the county completely to find property. One notable Marine living in the area is Sergeant Keith Carman, designer of the "Carman Pack Stand Steering Tool". He is a decorated salt dog and revered by all those around him.

References 

Towns in North Carolina